von Jagow is a German noble family. Notable members include:

Dietrich von Jagow, SA leader and ambassador to Hungary
Friedrich Wilhelm von Jagow, Prussian general
Gottlieb von Jagow, German foreign minister
Matthias von Jagow, Brandenburg clergyman

German noble families
Pomeranian nobility